In transport engineering, subgrade is the native material underneath a constructed road, pavement or railway track (US: railroad track). It is also called formation level.

The term can also refer to imported material that has been used to build an embankment.

Construction

Subgrades are commonly compacted before the construction of a road, pavement or railway track

See also 
 Subsoil
 Track bed

References

Road transport
Pavements
Transportation engineering
Permanent way